is a 1994 Japanese documentary and docudrama film directed by Kazuo Hara about writer Mitsuharu Inoue. It shows the last four years of Inoue's life while fighting cancer, and tries to capture his character and the influence he had on the people around him.

Synopsis
Filming Inoue both at public appearances and in private, and interviewing fellow writers like Yutaka Haniya as well as former pupils of Inoue's literary training centers, some of which speak frankly about their affair with their married teacher, Kazuo Hara draws a portrait of a multi-faceted personality: socially committed and egotistical, extroverted and hiding behind a persona.

Additionally, the film contains scenes which re-enact Inoue's childhood and youth according to his own accounts, which are partially put into question by statements from relatives.

Cast
 Mitsuharu Inoue
 Yutaka Haniya
 Jakuchō Setouchi
 Hiroshi Noma
 Ikuko Inoue
 Kim Gumija as Mother Takako
 Yoshie Yamamoto as Grandmother Saka
 Haruhi Iso as Choi Tsuruyo
 Masayuki Kubota as Mitsuharu as youth
 Hiroya Sugiyama as Mitsuharu as child

Production
Early into the film's production, Inoue was diagnosed with liver metastasis, underwent an operation (which is shown in detail) and continued his work as a writer and teacher. He died in May 1992.

Reception
Upon the film's presentation at the Forum section of the 1995 Berlin International Film Festival, critic David Stratton, writing for Variety magazine, called A Dedicated Life "riveting viewing, and, in the end, extremely moving", and "a demanding, but most impressive, film portrait".

Awards
 19th Hochi Film Award for Best Film
 49th Mainichi Film Award for Best Film
 68th Kinema Junpo Award for Best Film
 18th Japan Academy Film Prize – Special Award for Kazuo Hara

Notes

References

External links
 

1994 films
1994 documentary films
Films directed by Kazuo Hara
Japanese documentary films
Documentary films about writers
Best Film Kinema Junpo Award winners
1990s Japanese films